William Evans (d. 1720?), was a Welsh Presbyterian minister.

Life
Evans was educated at the college at Ystradwalter, then under the presidency of the Rev. Rees Prytherch. He was ordained at Pencader, near Carmarthen, in 1688, and continued pastor there for fifteen years. In 1703 he removed to Carmarthen to become pastor of the presbyterian congregation, and received in his house students for the Christian ministry. He has been regarded as the founder of the Welsh Academy, from the fact that the education of divinity students first assumed under him a collegiate form.

Evans was patronised both by the London funds and by the liberality of wealthy dissenters. Dr. Daniel Williams bequeathed a sum of money towards his support, and it continued to his successors. He is supposed to have retired in 1718, and he died in 1720.

Works
In 1707 Evans published in Welsh The Principles of the Christian Religion, based apparently on Westminster Assembly's catechism; in 1714 he published and wrote a preface for Gemmeu Doethineb ("Gems of Wisdom"), a work by his old tutor Rees Prytherch. In 1717 he wrote  and long preface to his friend and neighbour Iago ab Dewi's translation of Matthew Henry's Catechism; in 1757 Abel Morgan published Evans's Principles of the Christian Religion, which he had adapted so as to teach adult baptism.

References

Year of birth missing
1720 deaths
17th-century births
18th-century Welsh people
Welsh theologians
18th-century Christian theologians
Welsh-language writers
Welsh Presbyterians
18th-century Presbyterian ministers
18th-century Welsh writers
18th-century British male writers
17th-century Welsh writers
Welsh male non-fiction writers
18th-century Welsh theologians